Parc Bagatelle is a seasonal amusement park in Rang-du-Fliers, France. Founded in 1955, it is the oldest amusement park in France.

History
Opened in 1955 by Henri Parent, Parc Bagatelle is the oldest operating Amusement Park in France. It was taken over by the Parents' son, François, in 1971. The park was sold to the Looping Group by Compagnie des Alpes (known as Grévin & Co until 2002) in 2011. The park is currently directed by François-Jerome Parent, grandson of Henri Parent.

Attractions

Roller coasters
Parc Bagatelle is home to five roller coasters.

Water rides

Thrill rides

Former attractions

Former roller coasters

References

Amusement parks in France
1955 establishments in France
Amusement parks opened in 1955